Educação Visual is the first album of Portuguese MC, Valete. It was launched in the year 2002.

Track listing 

Valete albums
2002 debut albums